Gornji Crniš is a village in the municipality of Tutin, Serbia. According to the 2002 census, the village has a population of 36 people.

History 
The inhabitants of Crniš, Paljevo and Dubovo stem from the Hoti fis which settled in the area in the late 17th/early 18th century.

Today, almost all villagers identify themselves as Bosniaks (2002 census).

References

Populated places in Raška District